Cortas may refer to:

Cortàs, locality in Province of Lleida, Catalonia, Spain
Wadad Makdisi Cortas (1909–1979), Lebanese educator and writer

See also
Kortas (disambiguation)